The Principal Scientific Adviser (PSA) is the chief advisor to the government on matters related to scientific policy. It is currently a Secretary level position created in 1999 by the Atal Bihari Vajpayee government. At the time, the position was a Cabinet rank position, with the first PSA being A. P. J. Abdul Kalam. This was followed by Rajagopala Chidambaram who held the rank of a Minister of State and was the PSA for 16 years. The current PSA is Ajay Kumar Sood.

The 'Office of the Principal Scientific Adviser', through the Prime Minister's Science, Technology and Innovation Advisory Council (PM-STIAC) helps scientific cross-sectoral synergy across  ministries, institutions and the industry.

Appointees
There have been a total of four PSAs so far:

Office of the Principal Scientific Adviser 
The Office of the Principal Scientific Adviser to the Government of India advises the government in science and technology policies and interventions that are of strategic socio-economic importance to the country. This is done in collaboration with various ministries, institutions, academia and industry. The PM-STIAC is one of the catalysts for such tasks and also overseas the implementation of the tasks.

Nine National Missions 
On 6 March 2019, the PSA announced nine new science and technology missions with a focus on 'Science for People and People for Science':

 Natural Language Translation
 Quantum Frontier
 Artificial Intelligence
 National Biodiversity Mission
 Electric Vehicles
 Bio-science for Human Health
 Waste to Wealth
 Deep Ocean Exploration
 Accelerating Growth of New India's Innovations (AGNIi)

Other major projects include Research Clusters, Earth Museum, Brahmaputra River System, I-STEM Facilities Map and Energy Security.

Prime Minister's Science, Technology and Innovation Advisory Council (PM-STIAC) 
The Council allows the Office of the Principal Scientific Adviser to ascertain the status, challenges and interventions needed in the science and technology domain so as to advise the PM is as best a manner as possible. The PM's STIAC increases the collaboration and focus needed to answer complex problems in appropriate time periods. One of the ways this is done is through it missions.

Members 
Members include:

V. K. Saraswat, Member, NITI Aayog & former Chairman, DRDO
A. S. Kiran Kumar, former Chairman, ISRO
Ajay Kumar Sood, Professor, Indian Institute of Science, Bengaluru
Lieutenant General Madhuri Kanitkar, Dean, Armed Forces Medical College, Pune
Sanghamitra Bandyopadhyay, Director, Indian Statistical Institute, Kolkata
Manjul Bhargava, Professor, Princeton University, USA
Subhash Kak, Professor, Oklahoma State University, USA
Baba Kalyani, Chairman and Managing Director, Bharat Forge, Pune

See also 
 List of office-holders in India
 Chief Economic Advisor to the Government of India

References 

Indian government officials
Science and technology in India
Chief scientific advisers by country